United States Senate Bean Soup or simply Senate bean soup is a soup made with navy beans, ham hocks, and onion. It is served in the dining room of the United States Senate every day, in a tradition that dates back to the early 20th century.  The original version included celery, garlic, parsley, and possibly mashed potatoes as well.

Tradition
According to the Senate website, "Bean soup is on the menu in the Senate's restaurant every day. There are several stories about the origin of that mandate, but none has been corroborated."

On September 14, 1943, rationing due to World War II left the Senate kitchen without enough navy beans to serve the soup. The Washington Times-Herald reported on its absence the following day. In a speech on the Senate floor in 1988, Bob Dole recounted the response to the crisis: "Somehow, by the next day, more beans were found and bowls of bean soup have been ladled up without interruption ever since."

Recipes

Senate versions
A 1967 memo from the Architect of the Capitol to the Librarian of the Senate describes the modern recipe, calling for "two pounds of small Michigan Navy Beans".

John Egerton writes in Southern Food that the use of ham hocks suggests an origin in Southern cuisine. Although the legislators credited with institutionalizing the soup did not represent Southern states, most of the cooks at the time were black Southerners who would prepare bean soup in their own style. There was a period when the Senate dining services omitted the ham and instead used a soup base. In 1984, a new manager discovered this practice; he later reflected, "we went back to the ham hocks, and there was a real difference."

There are two Senate soup recipes:

Reviews and variants
Carrot is also present in Senate Bean Soup, as shown in the picture above. Although missing in the recipes above, nearly every recipe uses carrots. 

According to The Best Soups in the World, "most reports ... suggest that it unfortunately leaves a lot to be desired."

Availability
As of 2010, members of the public can try the soup in the Senate dining room. There is a dress code, and entry requires a "request letter" from a senator. The soup is also available to the general public at the Capitol Visitor Center restaurant on a rotating basis and in the Longworth Cafeteria.

The Project Greek Island bunker, a Cold War-era emergency relocation center for Congress, included a cafeteria that would have served Senate bean soup.

Past prices for a bowl include:
1940: $0.15
1996: $1.00
1997: $1.10
2004: $4.50
2008: $5.00
2010: $6.00
2014: $3.60 for a  bowl

See also

 List of bean soups
 List of ham dishes – also includes ham hock dishes
 List of legume dishes
 Traditions of the United States Senate

Notes

References

External links

Senate Bean Soup Recipe - from the official website of the United States Senate, accessed 27 October 2013.

United States Senate
Legume dishes
American soups
American pork dishes